is a private university in Japan, headquartered in Nagayoshi-cho, Kagoshima City, Kagoshima prefecture. It was set up in 1950, and students were recruited in fiscal year 1959. It became Kagoshima College of Economics after it abolishes it, and the school corporate Tsumagari educational institution establishes the Kagoshima junior college as an annex in 1967 afterwards. They move in 2001.

Outline

The entire university 
 Private junior college in Japan having been managed by school corporate Tsumagari educational institution. Only the commercial course : the subject set up from the installation in 1950 to abolition.

Academic traditions and trait 
 It is possible to look for the appearance to which a special education based on commerce is done from the subject name set up.

History 
 The Kagoshima commercial course junior college is founded in 1950.
 It is ended to want the student in fiscal year 1959. It shifts from times of next year to Kagoshima College of Economics.
 Close 1963 learning.

The basic data

Address 
 Kagoshima Prefecture Kagoshima City Nagayoshi-cho

Education and research

Organization

Subject 
 Commercial course

Advanced course 
 None

Special course 
 None

About the acquisition qualification 
 The second junior high school occupation department teacher class license and the second high school commercial department teacher class license were put.

Person related to university and organization

List of person related to university

Person related to university 
 The successive president
 Keida Shigeru
 Kuroki Nagatarou

Related item 
 The International University of Kagoshima
 Department of Junior College at The International University of Kagoshima
 Junior college list of abolished Japan

Reference literature 
'Compendium of nationwide school'
'Nationwide junior college list'
'Nationwide private university and junior college entrance guide' (For fiscal year 1952: Japanese Association of Private Universities of Japan private junior college society coeditorship)
'Recognition university junior college list of teacher training course' (Ministry of Education [daigakugakujutsukyokuhen])
'Surveying such as recognition universities of teacher training course and junior colleges' (Chapter of society of head of nationwide high school . the first regulations publication)
'Nationwide junior college Technical Colleges list' (Training Section the Ministry of Education Higher Education Bureau technology supervision)

Footnotes 

Japanese junior colleges
Universities and colleges in Kagoshima Prefecture
Private universities and colleges in Japan